China United Coalbed Methane Corp., Ltd. (CUCBM), also known as China CBM, is state-owned company in China, which had exclusive rights until 2010 to explore, develop and produce coal mine methane in cooperation with overseas companies. The company was established in 1996.

History
China United Coalbed Methane Corp., Ltd. was founded by two ministries and one state-owned enterprise of the State Council of the People's Republic of China in 1996 (China National Petroleum Corp.,  and ). Under the Regulation on Sino-foreign Cooperation in the Development of Continental Petroleum Resources, which was revised on 2001, the corporation was the monopoly to sign deal with foreign industry to explore and produce coalbed methane. Although in 2007 another revise of the regulation giving the state council nominate other company in case-by-case basis. The State Council formally authorized 3 more companies in 2010, namely China National Petroleum Corporation (which already acquired the rights by 2009 partial demerger of China CBM), China Petrochemical Corporation and Henan Coalbed Methane Development and Utilization Co., Ltd.

Shareholders
As at 31 December 2014 China National Offshore Oil Corporation (CNOOC) owned 100% stake. CNOOC acquired 30% stake in 2014, 20% stake in 2013 and 50% stake in 2010 from fellow state-owned enterprise China National Coal Group.

China National Coal Group was the sole shareholder from 2009 to 2010, which acquired 50% stake from PetroChina. (in turn PetroChina acquired some assets from China United Coalbed Methane and incorporated "PetroChina Coalbed Methane")

PetroChina and China National Coal Group acquired the stake in 1999 from its parent China National Petroleum Corporation and the Ministry of Land and Resources of the People's Republic of China respectively.

See also

Coal power in China

References

External links
 

Coal companies of China
Natural gas companies of China
Government-owned companies of China
Energy companies established in 1996
Non-renewable resource companies established in 1996
Chinese companies established in 1996
China National Offshore Oil Corporation